Breakfast with Hunter is a 2003 documentary film about the everyday life of gonzo-journalist Hunter S. Thompson by Wayne Ewing.

The film includes a variety of well-known figures involved with Thompson throughout his life, including P. J. O'Rourke, Ralph Steadman, Roxanne Pulitzer, Johnny Depp, Terry Gilliam and Benicio del Toro.

Live stage segments were recorded at The Viper Room in early September 1996.

References

External links

Breakfast with Hunter film website
HunterThompsonFilms.com
Website of Wayne Ewing Films, Inc.
Wayne Ewing interview by the Viking Youth Power Hour

2003 films
Works about Hunter S. Thompson
American documentary films
Documentary films about writers
2003 documentary films
2000s English-language films
2000s American films